The Attorney-General's Department is a department of the federal government of Australia responsible for law and justice, and since 29 May 2019, industrial relations.

The head of the department is the Secretary of the Attorney-General's Department, currently Katherine Jones , who reports to the Attorney-General for Australia, currently Mark Dreyfus.

History
The Attorney-General's Department is one of seven original Commonwealth Departments of state, commencing with the Commonwealth of Australia on 1 January 1901. It is one of only three departments, along with Defence and Treasury, to have operated continuously under their original name and charter since Federation.

Organisation
The department is organised into five groups, each headed by a Deputy Secretary. These Deputy Secretaries report to the Secretary who co-ordinates and devises departmental structure and policy.

These five groups are:
 Australian Government Solicitor
 Legal services and Families
 Integrity and International
 Industrial Relations
 Enabling Services

The Attorney-General's Department is located at the Robert Garran Offices, 3-5 National Circuit, Barton in the Australian Capital Territory.

Departmental Secretary
The permanent secretary of the Attorney-General's Department is the non-political public service head of the department. This role dates from federation, and the first incumbent, Sir Robert Garran, was the first (and for a time the only) public servant employed by the federal government. In that role, he was responsible for overseeing the first federal election and setting up the rest of the federal bureaucracy by transferring state government functions to the federal government.

From 1916, when the position of Solicitor-General of Australia was created as the second law officer and deputy of the Attorney-General, the permanent secretary served concurrently as Solicitor-General, until the two roles were separated in 1964. Under the Law Officers Act passed that year, the Solicitor-General's role was clarified as statutory counsel deputising for the Attorney-General, separate from the role of the permanent secretary.

On the recommendation of the Prime Minister, the Governor-General has appointed the following individuals as Secretary of the department:

Mission and outcomes

The mission of the department is "achieving a just and secure society". In pursuing this mission, the department works towards achieving *A just and secure society through the maintenance and improvement of Australia's law and justice framework and its national security and emergency management system".

Operational functions
The Administrative Arrangements Order made on 01 June 2022 details the following responsibilities to the Department:
 Law and justice, including -
 Administrative law
 Alternative dispute resolution
 Bankruptcy
 Constitutional law
 Courts and tribunals
 Human rights
 International law
 Law reform
 Legal assistance
 Legislative drafting
 Marriage and family law
 Personal property securities
 Legal services to the Commonwealth
 Law enforcement policy and operations
 Administration of criminal justice, including - 
 Criminal law policy and principles of criminal responsibility
 Matters relating to prosecution
 Sentencing and management of federal offenders
 Internal crime cooperation, including extradition and mutual assistance in criminal matters
 Protective security policy 
 Protective services at Commonwealth establishments and diplomatic and consular premises in Australia
 Administrative support for Royal Commissions and certain other inquiries
 Privacy
 Freedom of Information
 Native title
 Fraud and anti-corruption policy
 Whole of government integrity policy and activities
 Copyright
 National child protection policy and strategy

See also

 Attorney-General's Department (South Australia)
 Australasian Fire and Emergency Service Authorities Council
 List of Australian Commonwealth Government entities

References

Government departments of Australia
Ministries established in 1901
Justice ministries
Government agencies established in 1901
Legal organisations based in Australia
Attorneys-General of Australia